Spatalistiforma is an extinct genus of moths belonging to the family Tortricidae. It contains only one species, Spatalistiforma submerga, which was described from Baltic amber.

See also
List of Tortricidae genera

References

External links
tortricidae.com

†
Fossil Lepidoptera
Prehistoric insects of Europe
†